Cole Green railway station was a station at Cole Green, Hertfordshire, England, on the Hertford and Welwyn Junction Railway. It was a passenger station from 1858 until 18 June 1951, also serving the hamlet of Letty Green.

It is now a picnic spot on the Cole Green Way footpath and cycle trail.

The station was used in the film The Lady with a Lamp (1951). Florence Nightingale arrives at the station near her home. The train is hauled by the early steam locomotive Lion, with three four-wheeler passenger coaches, two of them named Experience and Huskisson.

References

Disused railway stations in Hertfordshire
Former Great Northern Railway stations
Railway stations in Great Britain opened in 1858
Railway stations in Great Britain closed in 1951
1858 establishments in England
1951 disestablishments in England